Panjeh Ali-ye Jonubi Rural District is a rural district (dehestan) in the Central District of Qorveh County, Kurdistan Province, Iran. At the 2006 census, its population was 6,762, in 1,510 families. The rural district has 17 villages.

References 

Rural Districts of Kurdistan Province
Qorveh County